The 2016 United States Senate election in Arkansas was held November 8, 2016, to elect a member of the United States Senate to represent the State of Arkansas, concurrently with the 2016 U.S. presidential election, as well as other elections to the United States Senate in other states and elections to the United States House of Representatives and various state and local elections.

Incumbent Republican Senator John Boozman won re-election to a second term in office, becoming the first Republican senator reelected in the history of the state. Former U.S. Attorney Conner Eldridge was the only Democrat to declare his candidacy. The primaries were held March 1. This is also the first election that the state has simultaneously voted for a Republican Senate candidate and a Republican presidential candidate.

Republican primary

Candidates

Declared 
 John Boozman, incumbent U.S. Senator
 Curtis Coleman, businessman, candidate for governor in 2014 and candidate for the U.S. Senate in 2010

Polling

Results

Democratic primary 

Conner Eldridge was unopposed for the Democratic nomination.

Candidates

Declared 
 Conner Eldridge, former United States Attorney for the Western District of Arkansas

Results

Third parties 
The Libertarian Party of Arkansas held a special nominating convention on October 24, 2015, to select nominees for elections in 2016.  Frank Gilbert was selected as the nominee for the U.S. Senate race.

Candidates

Nominated 
 Frank Gilbert, DeKalb Township Constable, former mayor of Tull, nominee for the state senate in 2012 and nominee for governor in 2014

General election

Candidates 
 John Boozman (R), incumbent senator
 Conner Eldridge (D), former United States Attorney for the Western District of Arkansas
 Frank Gilbert (L), DeKalb Township Constable, former mayor of Tull, nominee for the state senate in 2012 and nominee for governor in 2014

Debates

Predictions

Polling 

with Mike Beebe

Results

References

External links 
Official campaign websites (Archived)
 John Boozman (R)
 Curtis Coleman (R)
 Conner Eldridge (D)
 Frank Gilbert (L)

2016
Arkansas
United States Senate